The La Mouette Atlas is a French high-wing, single-place, hang glider, designed and produced by La Mouette of Fontaine-lès-Dijon.

Design and development
The Atlas was initially conceived as a competition hang glider, and, in that role it achieved many competitive wins. Due to its ease of handling it was also used as a flight training aircraft. As its performance was surpassed by the newer double surface and later "topless" hang gliders it became no longer competitive, but retained its role as a training machine. Over 8000 have been built, making it one of the most produced hang gliders ever.

The aircraft is made from aluminum tubing, with the single-surface wing covered in Dacron sailcloth. All models have a  span wing, which is cable braced from a single kingpost. The nose angle is 120°. All models are certified as DHV Class 2.

Operational history
When the Atlas was competitive it won national championships in most European countries. It also won championships in Argentina, Brazil and Japan, as well as the  European championships and world team championships.

Variants
Atlas 14
Small-size model for lighter pilots.
Atlas 16
Large-size model for heavier pilots.

Specifications (Atlas 16)

References

External links
Official webpage archive on Archive.org

Atlas
Hang gliders